KAIST Satellite Technology Research Center (SaTReC), is a university based research center for satellite technology and applications research.

Space Programme
SaTReC, which is located within the Korea Advanced Institute of Science and Technology (KAIST), promotes the education and training of satellite engineers through research programs in satellite engineering, space science and remote sensing. In 1992, SaTReC developed and launched the first satellite of Korea, KITSAT-1, a scientific microsatellite. Since then, SaTReC continues to develop satellites with scientific and technology demonstration missions.

Satellite Missions
 Development and Operations of Kitsat-1
 Development and Operations of Kitsat-2
 Development and Operations of Kitsat-3

References

Space program of South Korea
Aerospace research institutes